Kitsap or Ktsap (died April 18, 1860) was a war chief of the Suquamish Native American tribe. One source says that he was the most powerful chief on Puget Sound from 1790 to 1845. Kitsap County, Washington and the Kitsap Peninsula are named for him.

He was an ancestor of Johnny Kitsap, 1908, also known as Chief Kitsap.

Having been prominent before white settlement of Puget Sound began, oral history is the only basis for most of what can be said about Kitsap, and many reports offer conflicting information.  He may have been one of the Indians who was welcomed aboard HMS Discovery by Captain George Vancouver during his exploration of Puget Sound.  Some sources indicate that it was Kitsap who had Old Man House, Puget Sound's largest longhouse, built on Agate Pass, though other sources debate this.

Aside from being one of the best-known war chiefs of the Suquamish, at one point Kitsap was acknowledged as the head of the largest intertribal coalition which the Puget Sound had ever seen.  Around 1825, The Puget Sound Indians, not normally organized above the level of individual bands, formed a confederation under Kitsap to strike against the Cowichan Tribes of southeast Vancouver Island, who often raided the Puget Sound.  However, Kitsap's flotilla was no match for the larger canoes of the Cowichans; after suffering heavy losses in the sea battle, the Puget Sound Indians were forced to retreat.  Kitsap was one of the few survivors of this ill-fated expedition.

Sources suggest that Kitsap was the brother of Schweabe, the father of Chief Seattle.

Another Kitsap, a leader of the Muckleshoot tribe, was prominent in the Indian War of 1855–1856.  Like his comrade in arms, Chief Leschi, Kitsap was arrested for the part he played in the hostilities, but he was acquitted.  Known to boast of his healing skills and his supposed invincibility (he claimed that no man could kill him), Kitsap of the Muckleshoot was killed shortly after returning to his tribe in 1860.  Three of his tribesmen had fallen ill, and died after he administered them a red liquid as medicine; their relations killed Kitsap to avenge what they saw as willful murder.

References

18th-century births
1860 deaths
Murdered Native American people
Native American leaders
1860 murders in the United States
19th-century Native Americans
People from Washington (state)